Ida Kerkovius  (1879–1970) was a Baltic German painter and weaver from Latvia.

Life
Kerkovius was one of twelve children born to an upper-class Baltic German family. She was taught piano at an all-girls secondary school before attending a private institution in Riga. In Riga, she studied with Adolf Hölzel and grew to have an acute understanding of paint and colour. 

She became an assistant and theorist at the Königlich Württembergische Akademie der Bildenden Künste in Stuttgart (the Royal Academy of the Arts in the Kingdom of Württemberg) before losing her citizenship, and thus her place at the academy, during World War I. Kerkovius then taught foreign students in similar positions and registered at the Bauhaus, where she eventually joined the weaving workshop. Her income between the wars came primarily from the weaving workshop and through the secret sale of Kerkovius’s art by art dealer Bekker vom Rath. Her studio in Stuttgart was bombed during World War II, destroying many of her existing paintings. 

She was later named a member of the artists’ guild of Esslingen am Neckar and was awarded first prize for work in the 1955 exhibition Ischia im Bilde deutscher Maler.

Exhibitions

Solo exhibitions

 Leopold-Hoesch Museum, Düren, Germany, 1929
 Württembergischer Kunstverein, Stuttgart, Germany, 1930
 Galerie Valentien, Stuttgart, Germany, 1933
 Württembergischer Kunstverein, Stuttgart, Germany, 1948
 Württembergischer Kunstverein, Stuttgart, Germany, 1954
 Galerie Günther Franke, Munich, Germany, 1958
 Württembergischer Kunstverein, Stuttgart, Germany, 1959
 Museum am Ostwall, Dortmund, Germany, 1961
 Galerie Maerchklin, Stuttgart, Germany, 1962
 Galerie Vömel, Düsseldorf, Germany, 1963
 Galerie Günther Franke, Munich, Germany, 1963
 Galerie Valentien, Stuttgart, Germany, 1964
 Nassauischer Kunstverein, Wiesbaden, 1964
 Düsseldorfer Museum, Germany, 1964
 Galerie Maercklin, Stuttgart, Germany, 1964
 Galerie Bremer, Berlin, Germany, 1965
 Kunstnernes, Oslo, Norway, 1966
 Heidelberger Kunstverein, Heidelberg, Germany, 1966
 Galerie Günther Franke, Munich, Germany, 1967
 Württembergischer Kunstverein, Stuttgart, Germany, 1969
 Galerie Maercklin, Stuttgart, Germany, 1969
 Galerie der Stadt, Stuttgart, (retrospective), Germany, 1979
 Galerie Orangerie-Reinz, Cologne, (retrospective), Germany, 1981
 Frankfurter Kunstkabinett, Frankfurt am Main, (retrospective), Germany, 1988

Group exhibitions

L'altra metà dell'avanguardia, 1910–1940, Palazzo Reale, Milan, Italy, 1980
 Das Verborgene Museum I, Akademie der Künste, Berlin, Germany, 1987
 Frauen im Aufbruch, Künstlerinnen im deutschen Südwesten 1800–1945, Stadtische Galerie, Germany, 1995

References 

19th-century German painters
Baltic-German people
Bauhaus alumni
Women textile artists
German art educators
German weavers
20th-century German painters
German women painters